
The Prince Society, or Prince Society for Mutual Publication, (1858-1944) in Boston, Massachusetts, published "rare works, in print or manuscript, relating to America." It was named after Thomas Prince, fifth pastor of Old South Church in Boston. Historian Samuel Gardner Drake founded the society because he "had not been made a member of the Massachusetts Historical Society, and he resented it." Officials of the Prince Society included William Sumner Appleton, John Ward Dean, Charles E. Goodspeed, Edmund F. Slafter, John Wingate Thornton, and William Henry Whitmore. It operated from offices in Bromfield Street (ca.1868) and Somerset Street (ca.1872, 1908). Around 1920 society members "realized at last that a publication society 'on the mutual principle' had become an anomaly in this day and generation." The society continued for several "years of poise before the final leap into the abyss" in 1944.

References

Further reading

Publications of the society
 New England's Prospect (1865) by William Wood.
 The Hutchinson Papers (1865) William H. Whitmore, ed.
 John Duton's Letters from New England (1867) William H. Whitmore, ed.
 Sir William Alexander and American Colonization (1863) William H. Whitmore, ed.
 The Andros Tracts (1874) William H. Whitmore, ed.
 John Wheelwright (1876) by Charles H. Bell
 Voyages of the Northmen to America (1877) by Rev. Edmund F. Slafter
 The Voyages of Samuel de Champlain (1880, 1878, and 1882) by Rev. Edmund F. Slafter
 The New English Canaan of Thomas Morton (1883) by Charles Francis Adams
 Sir Walter Ralegh and His Colony in America (1884) by the Rev. Increase N. Tarbox
 Voyages of Peter Esprit Radisson (1885) by Gideon D. Scull
 
 Antinomianism in the Colony of Massachusetts Bay (1894) by Adams
 John Checkley, or the Evolution of Religious Tolerance in Massachusetts Bay (1897) by Slafter
 Edward Randolph, five volumes (1898-1899) by Robert N. Toppan and Alfred T. S. Goodrick
 Sir Humfrey Gylberte and His Enterprise of Colonization in America (1903) by Carlos Slafter

About the society
 

1858 establishments in Massachusetts
1944 disestablishments in Massachusetts
Organizations disestablished in 1944
19th century in Boston
20th century in Boston
Organizations based in Boston
Historical societies in Massachusetts